is a railway station on the  Echigo Tokimeki Railway Myōkō Haneuma Line in the city of Jōetsu, Niigata, Japan, operated by the third-sector operator Echigo Tokimeki Railway.  It is also a freight terminal for the Japan Freight Railway Company.

Lines

Station layout
The station has  one island platform, connected to the station building by an underground passage. This station has a zig zag.

Platforms

Adjacent stations

History
The station opened on 1 May 1911. With the privatization of Japanese National Railways (JNR) on 1 April 1987, the station came under the control of JR East. From this date, Nihongi Station was transferred to the ownership of the third-sector operating company Echigo Tokimeki Railway.

Passenger statistics
In fiscal 2017, the station was used by an average of 140 passengers daily (boarding passengers only).

Surrounding area
 Former Nagago village hall
Nakago Elementary School
Nakago Junior High School
Nakago Post Office

See also
 List of railway stations in Japan

References

External links

 Echigo Tokimeki Railway Station information 
 Timetable for Nihongi Station 

Stations of Echigo Tokimeki Railway
Stations of Japan Freight Railway Company
Railway stations in Niigata Prefecture
Railway stations in Japan opened in 1911
Jōetsu, Niigata